Wetzel is the name of several persons, places, and other entities:

People:
Carl Wetzel (born 1938), American hockey player
Dan Wetzel, American writer and sports columnist
David Wetzel (born ca. 1980?), American musician, member of the band Ghosty
Donald Wetzel, American baseball player and inventor
 (born 1909), Germen Hauptsturmführer, mid-grade company level officer and equivalent of a captain in the German Army
Gary George Wetzel (born 1947), American soldier, Medal of Honor recipient
George P. Wetzel, Sr. (1921-2014), American legislator and jurist
Jake Wetzel (born 1976), American-Canadian rower
John Wetzel (basketball) (born 1944), American basketball player and coach
John Wetzel (American football) (born 1991), professional American football player
John Wetzel (Pennsylvania official), Pennsylvania Secretary of Corrections
Julia Wetzel, American cryptologist with the National Security Administration
Karl Friedrich Gottlob Wetzel (1779–1819), German writer
Lewis Wetzel (1763–1808), American frontiersman
Robert Lewis "Sam" Wetzel, American army officer
Susanne Wetzel, German computer scientist
Sylvia Wetzel (born 1949), German feminist
Walter C. Wetzel (died 1945), American soldier, Medal of Honor recipient
Wolfgang Wetzel (born 1968), German politician

Other:
Wetzel County, West Virginia
Wetzel's Pretzels, an American restaurant chain
Wetzel's Climbing Mouse, Rhipidomys wetzeli, a species of mouse native to Venezuela.

German-language surnames